The m:tel Premier League of Bosnia and Herzegovina, also known as Liga 12, is the top tier football league in Bosnia and Herzegovina, and is operated by the Football Association of Bosnia and Herzegovina. As the country's most prestigious level of football competition, the league changed format in the 2016–17 season and is contested by 12 clubs with the last two teams relegated at the end of every season.

The League is, as of the 2021–22 season, represented by four clubs in European competition. The winner of the Premier League starts from the UEFA Champions League first qualifying round. The winner of the Bosnia and Herzegovina Football Cup as well as the runner-up and third placed team on the table starts from the first qualifying round of the UEFA Europa Conference League.

At the end of the season, the bottom two teams are relegated while winners of the First League of the Federation of Bosnia and Herzegovina and the First League of the Republika Srpska are promoted to the Premier League of Bosnia and Herzegovina.

History

War period 1992–1996
After breakup of Yugoslavia, and following proclamation of independence in late winter 1992, Bosnia and Herzegovina clubs left the Yugoslav First League, which ceased to exist after the 1991–92 season. Already in April the same year N/FSBiH applied for membership with FIFA and UEFA. Meanwhile, due to the outbreak of Bosnian War in April 1992 no games were played in the 1992–93 season. In late 1993 some parts of the country re-launched football competitions with reduced scope. But just as the country was divided along ethnic lines, so was football.

In 1993 Bosnian Croats launched  the Football Federation of Herzeg Bosnia and its First League of Herzeg-Bosnia, in which only Croatian clubs competed on parochial scale within the limits of West Herzegovina and few other enclaves. In the same year Bosnian Serbs also organized their own First League of the Republika Srpska, on a territory held by Republika Srpska regime at the time.
Only football on a territory under the control of then Republic of Bosnia and Herzegovina institutions and auspices of N/FSBiH, at the time consequently with Bosniak majority, apart from a brief competition for the season 1994–95 (won by Čelik Zenica), came to a standstill. 
Competition under auspices of N/FSBiH did not resume until 1995–96 season when the First League of Bosnia and Herzegovina was launched.

Post-war period 1996–2000
These three separate football leagues were operating in Bosnia and Herzegovina until 1998, and 2000. Since FIFA and UEFA showed support only for the association operating under patronage of the official and internationally recognized state institutions, during the war and prior to Dayton Peace Agreement as well as after its signage, they endorsed unification of all three organizations as N/FSBiH. This also came as a consequence of FIFA decision to recognize N/FSBiH already in July 1996, while in the same year UEFA admitted N/FSBiH as an adjacent member until 1998 when they recognized its full membership. This meant that only N/FSBiH clubs and its national team could compete at the international and official level.

Final unification has been preceded by several stages. At first was created a playoff where clubs were playing for the champion under N/FSBiH auspices. Idea was that playoff under unified N/FSBiH auspices should bring together clubs competing under three separate organizations for the first time but was rejected by Serb association, leaving clubs from Croat football association and N/FSBiH participating playoff for the seasons 1997–98 and 1999–00, while 1998–99 playoff was canceled due to Croat's association hesitation on the decision on which stadiums games should be played. Next season playoff was resumed for the last time prior to full and final agreement on unified N/FSBiH and its competition, Premier League BiH (Premijer Liga), in the fall 2000.

Premier League creation 2000–01
Full and final agreement on unified N/FSBiH and its competition, Premier League BiH (Premijer Liga), happened in the fall 2000. However, the first 2000–01 season seen clubs from Federation of BiH only, while clubs from Republic of Srpska entity continue to compete in their own separate league as their entity association still refused to join agreed unified N/FSBiH and its new competition. However, UEFA and FIFA never intended to recognize this separate organization nor its competition, which meant clubs could not compete outside territory of the entity and would not compete internationally. This situation forced clubs to insist that their organization also join N/FSBiH, and two years later they became part of the competition for the season 2002–03. Ever since the year 2000 Premier League is the top tier of Bosnia and Herzegovina football, with two entity-based leagues, First League of Republika Srpska and First League of the Federation of BiH, being pushed to the second tier of the football pyramid and serve as feeder leagues to Premier League.

Premier League as Liga 12 from 2016–17 until 2018–19
During the 2016–17 season and the 2017–18 season BH Telecom Premier League had changed its format entirely, reducing a number of clubs from 16 to 12, thus sometimes referred to as "Liga 12" (League 12), with the calendar also modified accordingly, and introducing playoffs (also known as the "title playoffs") and play out.
Number of matches were played by each club during regular season after which, according to their position, they entered to play-offs or play out. Playoffs were contested by the top 6 clubs in the regular season, with each club playing each other twice for the title, which guarantees Champions League qualifications, second and third place, guaranteeing Europa League qualifications berths. Play out was contested by six clubs to avoid relegation with last two teams being relegated.

Old format since 2018–19
Since the 2018–19 season, the league is not played as the last two seasons before. Actually very simple, after all the 12 clubs play each other two times, once home and once away, they play each other three times, also playing home or away depending on how the schedule is made. With that, the league season has 33 full rounds instead of the 22 rounds and an additional 10 rounds in the relegation and championship games.

Sponsorship
On 31 July 2012, the Football Association of Bosnia and Herzegovina signed a two-year deal with BH Telecom regarding the sponsorship of the league, effectively renaming the league BH Telecom Premier League. The deal was extended once more before the start of 2014–15 season. On 24 July 2020, it was announced that Mtel had become the new league sponsor for the next three years with an estimate 23 Million BAM worth, renaming the league m:tel Premier League.

2022–23 Member Clubs

Rankings
Source: Bert Kassies' website (country rankings; team rankings

Country
UEFA Country Ranking as of end-season of 2019–20 season.

Team
As of 17 December 2020

2022–23 season

Source

Bosnia and Herzegovina Champions

Champions of First League of Bosnia and Herzegovina
1994–95 - Čelik - "Champion of BiH"
1995–96 - Čelik - "Champion of BiH"
1996–97 - Čelik - "Champion of BiH"
1997–98 - Bosna Visoko - "Champion of First League of Bosnia and Herzegovina" (first round) 
1997–98 - Željezničar - "Champion of First League of Bosnia and Herzegovina" (Play-Offs) - Official champions 
1998–99 - Sarajevo - "Champion of BiH"
1999–2000 - Jedinstvo Bihać - "Champion of First League of Bosnia and Herzegovina" (first round) 
1999–2000 - Brotnjo - "Champion of First League of Bosnia and Herzegovina" (Play-Offs) - Official champions

Champions of First League of Herzeg-Bosnia
1993–94 - Široki Brijeg – Mario Prskalo (10 goals, Široki Brijeg)
1994–95 - Široki Brijeg – Anđelko Marušić (15, Široki Brijeg)
1995–96 - Široki Brijeg – Mario Marušić (15, Grude), Dejan Džepina (15, Novi Travnik)
1996–97 - Široki Brijeg – Anđelko Marušić (21, Široki Brijeg)
1997–98 - Široki Brijeg – Stanko Bubalo (31, Široki Brijeg)
1998–99 - Posušje – Slađan Filipović (19, Široki Brijeg)
1999–2000 - Posušje – Robert Ristovski (18, Kiseljak)

Champions of First League of the Republika Srpska

Champions of Bosnia and Herzegovina
Listing seasons (aside of 1998–99 season) before the creation of Premier League of Bosnia and Herzegovina where the champion was decided via a play-off played between best placed clubs who played in First League of Bosnia and Herzegovina and First League of Herzeg-Bosnia (without clubs from First League of the Republika Srpska).

1 A play-off between the best placed teams of First League of Bosnia and Herzegovina and First League of Herzeg-Bosnia was played; without clubs from First League of Republika Srpska. The best two clubs got the right to play in 1998–99 UEFA Cup.
2 Play-off was scheduled but was later canceled because of stadium issues. Three different leagues played, no play-off contested, therefore no club got the right to play in European competition.
3 A play-off between the best placed teams of First League of Bosnia and Herzegovina and First League of Herzeg-Bosnia was played without clubs from First League of Republika Srpska. Three clubs got the right to play in European competition.

Premier League Champions
Since the 2000–01 season, the first tier of Bosnia and Herzegovina's football competition became the Premier League of Bosnia and Herzegovina.

1 Played without clubs from the Republika Srpska entity of BiH which have only taken part in the league since 2002.

Times finished in first three
Counting since when the Premier League of Bosnia and Herzegovina is played and recognized by UEFA, season 2000–01

Cities
The following table lists the champions by cities; Counting since when the Premier League of Bosnia and Herzegovina is played and recognized by UEFA, season 2000–01

Notable performances in Europe

In the qualifiers for the UEFA Champions League season 2002–03, Željezničar gained the greatest success in Bosnian post-war club-football so far, going all the way to the last qualifying round for the most important club competition in Europe. After big wins over ÍA Akraness and Lillestrøm, however, they were held by Newcastle United. In the first match, held in Sarajevo, Newcastle won 0–1 with English team defeating Željezničar 4–0 in England.

The second time a Bosnian club moved into the last qualifying round of the UEFA Champions League was FK Sarajevo in 2007–08, when they lost to Dynamo Kyiv 0–4 on aggregate, after going over Maltese Marsaxlokk and Belgian side Genk.

Another remarkable season for Bosnian clubs in Europe was 2009–10. The most memorable performances were marked by FK Sarajevo and Slavija. While Slavija surprisingly beat Aalborg in the Second Qualifying round but could not overcome MFK Košice in the third round, FK Sarajevo was able to reach the Play-offs for the Group Stage of the newly formed UEFA Europa League after beating Spartak Trnava and Helsingborg. However, they lost there unhappily 3–2 on aggregate to CFR Cluj. FK Sarajevo made it again in 2014–15 UEFA Europa League playing all the way to the play-off round where they lost to Borussia Mönchengladbach. In the 2020–21 UEFA Europa League season, Sarajevo once again played in the play-off round, this time losing to Celtic.

All time table of Premier League of Bosnia and Herzegovina
Counting only since the 2002–03 season, the season the league became a unified country-wide league.
As of the end of the 2021–22 season.
Teams in bold are part of the 2022–23 season. 

Ssn = Number of seasons; Pld = Matches played; W = Matches won; D = Matches drawn; L = Matches lost; GF = Goals for; GA = Goals against; GD = Goal difference; Pts = Points; HF = Highest finish

 
1 In the 2004–05 season, Borac were deducted 1 point (Slavija were awarded 3–0 vs Borac in week 11).
2 In the 2006–07 season, Zrinjski were deducted 1 point (Orašje were awarded 3–0 vs Zrinjski).
3 In the 2013–14 season, Slavija were deducted 3 points.
4 In the 2019–20 season, Čelik were deducted 3 points (Željezničar were awarded 3–0 vs Čelik).
5 In the 2021–22 season, Velež were deducted 3 points (Borac were awarded 3–0 vs Velež).

See also
Bosnia and Herzegovina Football Cup

Notes

References

External links

plbih.ba 
N/FS BiH 
N/FS BiH 

League at UEFA

Stadiums at World Stadiums

 
0
Bosnia and Herzegovina